The Oregon Department of Fish and Wildlife (ODFW) is a government agency of the U.S. state of Oregon responsible for programs protecting Oregon fish and wildlife resources and their habitats.  
The agency operates hatcheries, issues hunting and angling licenses, advises on habitat protection, and sponsors public education programs.  Its history dates to the 1878 establishment of the office of Columbia River Fish Warden.  Since 1931, enforcement of Oregon's Fish and Game laws has been the responsibility of the Oregon State Police rather than separate wardens.

Hunting, Fishing, Shellfishing and Wildlife viewing 

A study was done in 2008 by ODFW and Travel Oregon to find the results of expenditures made throughout Oregon from residents and nonresidents that participated in the economic significance of fishing, hunting, wildlife viewing, and shellfish harvesting in Oregon. Roughly 2.8 million residents and non-residents participated in either hunting, fishing, wildlife viewing, and shellfish harvesting. 631,000 fished, 282,000 hunted, 175,000 harvested shellfish, and 1.7 million participated in wildlife viewing. During 2008 $2.5 billion in expenditures was made as a result of these activities. All regions of Oregon had benefited from the amount of expenditures made during 2008. Of this report fishing had a response rate of only 18%, hunting had a response rate of 26%, shellfishing had a response rate of 35% and wildlife viewing had a response rate of 62%.

Hunting 
282,000 residents and non-residents participated in hunting in 2008 from this residents and non-resident made travel generated expenditures of $104,458,000, $31,574,000 was spent on local recreation and $381,908,000 was spent from equipment.

Fishing 
631,000 residents and non-residents participated in fishing in 2008 from those that participated they spent a total of $264,605,000 on travel generated expenditures. $76,905,000 was spent on local recreation and $441,356,000 was spent on equipment.

Shellfishing 
175,000 residents and non-residents participated in shellfishing in 2008 from those that participated they spent a total of $31,039,000 on travel generated expenditures. $5,256,000 was spent on local recreation and $135,688,000 was spent on equipment.

Wildlife viewing 
1,700,000 residents and non-residents participated in wildlife viewing in 2008 from those that participated they spent a total of $462,087,000 on travel generated expenditures. $33,173,000 was spent on local recreation and $527,980,000 was spent on equipment.

Oregon Wildlife Management Units 

0. Warm Springs Indian Res. 10. Saddle Mountain  11. Scappoose

12. Wilson 14. Trask 15. Willamette 16. Santiam  17. Stott Mountain

18. Alsea 19. Mckenzie 20. Siuslaw 21. Indigo 22. Dixon  23. Melrose

24. Tioga  25. Sixes  26. Powers  27. Chetco

28. Applegate 29. Evans Creek 30. Rogue 31. Keno

32. Klamath Falls  33. Sprague 34. Upper Deschutes 35. Paulina

36. Maury 37. Ochoco 38. Grizzly 39. Metolius 40. Maupin

41. White River 42. Hood 43. Biggs  44. Columbia Basin 

45. Fossil 46. Murderers Creek 47. Northside 48. Heppner 49. Ukiah

50. Desolation 51. Sumpter 52. Starkey 53. Catherine Creek

54. Mount Emily 55. Walla Walla 56. Wenaha 57. Sled Springs

58. Chesnimnus 59. Snake River 60. Minam 61. Imnaha 62. Pine Creek

63. Keating 64. Lookout Mountain 65. Beulah 66. Malheur River 67. Owyhee

68. Whitehorse 69. Steens Mountain 70. Beaty's Butte 71. Juniper 72. Silvies

73. Wagontire 74. Warner 75. Interstate 76. Silver Lake 77. Fort Rock

State Wildlife Areas 
Bridge Creek Wildlife Area
Dean Creek Wildlife Area
Denman Wildlife Area
E.E. Wilson Wildlife Area
Elkhorn Wildlife Area
Fern Ridge Wildlife Area
Irrigon Wildlife Area
Jewell Meadows Wildlife Area
Klamath Wildlife Area
Ladd Marsh Wildlife Area
Lower Deschutes Wildlife Area
Phillip W. Schneider Wildlife Area
Prineville Reservoir Wildlife Area
Riverside Wildlife Area
Sauvie Island Wildlife Area
Snake River Islands Wildlife Area
Summer Lake Wildlife Area
Wenaha Wildlife Area
White River Wildlife Area
Willow Creek Wildlife Area

State marine reserves
Cape Falcon Marine Reserve
Cascade Head Marine Reserve
Otter Rock Marine Reserve
Cape Perpetua Marine Reserve
Redfish Rocks Marine Reserve

See also
List of law enforcement agencies in Oregon
List of State Fish and Wildlife Management Agencies in the U.S.

References

External links 
Official website

Fish and Wildlife
Department of Fish and Wildlife
State wildlife and natural resource agencies of the United States
1931 establishments in Oregon